Pavel Rosa (born June 7, 1977) is a Czech former professional ice hockey forward who played in the National Hockey League (NHL) with the Los Angeles Kings.

Playing career 
Rosa was selected by Kings in the second round (#50 overall) 1995 NHL Entry Draft, As a highly skilled forward, Rosa played in 36 games for the Kings since the 1998–99 season. Rosa most notably burst onto the North American stage in scoring two goals in his first NHL game.

During his junior career, he played with the Hull Olympiques and was one of the offensive leaders of a team that won the Memorial Cup in 1997. As a professional, he has played for the Manchester Monarchs and Fredericton Canadiens of the American Hockey League, Long Beach Ice Dogs of the International Hockey League, HPK and Jokerit of the Finnish Hockey League, HC Dynamo Moscow of the Russian hockey league, the Los Angeles Kings in the National Hockey League, and most recently Timrå IK, Rögle BK of the Swedish Elitserien league.

On July 7, 2014, Rosa signed as a free agent from Pelicans of the Liiga, to join on a one-year contract Czech based club, Orli Znojmo, who compete in the Austrian EBEL.

Career statistics

Regular season and playoffs

International

Awards 
2003-04: AHL John B. Sollenberger Trophy

References

External links
 
 

1977 births
Living people
Avangard Omsk players
Czech ice hockey right wingers
Czech expatriate ice hockey players in Russia
Fredericton Canadiens players
HC Dynamo Moscow players
HC Fribourg-Gottéron players
HPK players
Hull Olympiques players
Jokerit players
HC Litvínov players
Long Beach Ice Dogs (IHL) players
Los Angeles Kings draft picks
Los Angeles Kings players
HC Lugano players
Manchester Monarchs (AHL) players
Orli Znojmo players
Oulun Kärpät players
Lahti Pelicans players
Sportspeople from Most (city)
Rögle BK players
Timrå IK players
Czech expatriate ice hockey players in Canada
Czech expatriate ice hockey players in the United States
Czech expatriate ice hockey players in Sweden
Czech expatriate ice hockey players in Finland
Czech expatriate ice hockey players in Switzerland